Yanic Gentry or Yanic Arno Gentry Torfer (born 20 February 1991) is a Mexican sailor. He competed at the 2016 Summer Olympics, in the  Laser class, and placed 42nd among 46 participants.

References

1991 births
Living people
Mexican male sailors (sport)
Olympic sailors of Mexico
Sailors at the 2016 Summer Olympics – Laser
Pan American Games competitors for Mexico
Sailors at the 2015 Pan American Games